The Gulf short-fingered gecko  is found in the family Gekkonidae . It is monotypic in the genus Pseudoceramodactylus and contains one species Pseudoceramodactylus khobarensis. 

It is found on the Arabian Peninsula.

References 

Gekkonidae